Miss India Worldwide 2005 was the 14th edition of the international beauty pageant. The final was held in Mumbai, India on  January 9, 2005. About 16 countries were represented in the pageant. Amrita Hunjan  of the United Kingdom was crowned as the winner at the end of the event.

Results

Special awards

Delegates
 – Vimala Raman
 –  Simranjit Singh
 – Anusha Cherer 
 – Lakshmi Mohan
 – Shalani Mirchandani
 – Anchal Dwivedi
 – Bhavna Tolani 
 – Reshma van der Vliet
 – Rajini Sathyamurth
 – Zulfiya Merchant
 – Thebashini Jega Jeevan
 – Suraya Naidoo 
 – Lisa Dookie 
 – Madhuvanthi Ramakrishnan
 – Amrita Hunjan
 – Reshoo Pande

References

External links
http://www.worldwidepageants.com/

2005 beauty pageants